Colo is a 2017 Portuguese drama film directed by Teresa Villaverde. It was selected to compete for the Golden Bear in the main competition section of the 67th Berlin International Film Festival.

Plot
In Lisboa, a mother has two jobs while her husband is homeless, the effects of the economic crisis two years 2010. They have a daughter, who tries to find her way through the new financial limitations. With the hardships that accumulate, gradually the members of this family grow at ease with each other, and a tension grows in silence and guilt. The homeless country spends its days smelling the landscape on the horizon that does not offer opportunities for the future. Mãe always returns home exhausted after working double shifts. The daughter keeps secrets for herself, idealizing a life with money.

Cast
 Beatriz Batarda
 Angela Cerveira
 Marcello Urgeghe
 Ricardo Aibéo
 Clara Jost

References

External links
 

2017 films
2017 drama films
Portuguese drama films
2010s Portuguese-language films
Films directed by Teresa Villaverde